PRINCE may refer to:
 PRINCE, a block cipher targeting low latency, unrolled hardware implementations.
 PRINCE2 is a structured project management method.

See also
 Prince (disambiguation)